John Helyar (born 1951) is an American journalist and author. He is a graduate of Boston University. He is married to The Wall Street Journal’s Betsy Morris. Helyar has worked for The Wall Street Journal, Fortune magazine, ESPN.com, ESPN The Magazine and Bloomberg News. He is the author of the 1994 book, Lords of the Realm: The Real History of Baseball.

His reporting with Bryan Burrough on RJR Nabisco earned them the 1989 Gerald Loeb Award for Deadline and/or Beat Writing. They turned their research into the book Barbarians at the Gate: The Fall of RJR Nabisco, which was made into an HBO Emmy award-winning a film of the same title.

References

External links

1951 births
Living people
The Wall Street Journal people
20th-century American writers
21st-century American non-fiction writers
20th-century American journalists
American male journalists
Gerald Loeb Award winners for Deadline and Beat Reporting